Estádio Conde Dias Garcia is a multi-use stadium in São João da Madeira, Portugal.  It is currently used mostly for football matches and is the home ground of A.D. Sanjoanense. The stadium holds a seating capacity of 15,000.

References

External links
 Profile at ForaDeJogo
 Profile at ZeroZero

Conde Dias Garcia
Sports venues in Aveiro District
Sport in São João da Madeira
Buildings and structures in São João da Madeira